Olga Aleksandrovna Andrianova (15 June 1952 – 6 September 2022) was a Russian curler and curling coach.

As a coach of the Russian women's curling team she participated in 2002, 2006, and 2010 Winter Olympics. She was the main coach of Russian national women's curling team from  1998 to 2012.

She was a Master of Sport of Russia and Merited Coach of Russia. From 2006 to 2010 she was a President of Russian Curling Federation. From 2010 to 2022 she was a Secretary General of the Russian Curling Federation.

She graduated from Moscow Institute of Transport Engineers (1975) and Moscow State Academy of Physical Culture (1983).

Teams

Women's

Record as a coach of national teams

References

External links

1952 births
2022 deaths
Curlers from Moscow
Russian female curlers
Russian curling champions
Russian curling coaches
Honoured Coaches of Russia